The Colombian Liberal Party (PLC) is a centre to centre-left political party in Colombia. It was founded as a classical liberal party but later developed a more social-democratic tradition, joining the Socialist International in 1999.

The Liberal Party was the dominant force in Colombian politics alongside the Colombian Conservative Party until 2002, when the election victory of independent candidate Álvaro Uribe put an end to dominance of two party politics in Colombia.

Currently, the Liberal Party is the largest party in Congress, and has formed a coalition with the Social Party of National Unity, the major independent party in Colombia under the presidency of Ivan Duque.

History 
The party was founded in 1848 and, in opposition to the Colombian Conservative Party, became one of the two main political forces in the country for over a century. The two parties frequently engaged in armed conflict with one another, precipitating several civil wars.

In the 1940s, the liberal party turned towards socialism under the influence of the charismatic lawyer Jorge Eliécer Gaitán, despite the antipathy it provoked among party members and liberal leaders. In the rural area, Gaitanism faced a bloody repression to which its scrupulous respect for legality did not prepare it: 15,000 militants were murdered between 1945 and 1948 by death squads supposedly close to the conservatives. Gaitán himself, who was a likely winner of the next presidential election, was assassinated in 1948.

After the period known as La Violencia the Liberals and the Conservative Party reached an agreement to share power from 1958 to 1974 in the so-called National Front agreement that followed the fall of General Gustavo Rojas Pinilla. Nowadays there are many critics of the 16-year agreement but it greatly reduced the intensity of the violent political warfare that preceded it.

Following the end of the National Front agreement in 1974, the Liberal Party dominated Colombian politics until 2002; Liberal candidates won five of the seven Presidential elections and the party was the largest in both the Chamber of Representatives and Senate throughout the entire period.

In the 1994 election the Liberal Party's Ernesto Samper was narrowly elected president. Immediately afterwards he was accused of accepting millions from the Cali Cartel to fund his campaign. While Samper had immunity to prosecution as president, a number of his close associates were convicted of involvement in the so-called Proceso 8000 scandal, including Defence Minister Fernando Botero Zea. Partly due to the scandal the Liberal Party lost seats in the 1998 parliamentary election, although it remained easily the largest party. More seriously, the Liberals were defeated in the presidential election held the same year.

The Liberal Party suffered a major split in the lead-up to the 2002 elections. Horacio Serpa Uribe, the party's unsuccessful 1998 presidential candidate was nominated to run again. However Álvaro Uribe, a former senator and governor from the party launched an independent presidential campaign, backed by the Conservatives and dissident Liberals. Whereas Serpa supported the ongoing idea of negotiations with FARC, Uribe advocated confronting the guerrillas. Uribe was victorious in the elections, securing a majority in the first round. In the aftermath, the "Government endorsed" leadership of the party continued to oppose Uribe's administration, but many senators and representatives supported the government, becoming known as the "Uribist" faction. As a compromise, former president César Gaviria Trujillo was elected party leader in 2005.

At the 2006 legislative election, the Liberals lost around half their seats. While they remained the largest party in the Chamber of Representatives, they finished third in the Senate. Horacio Serpa was again nominated as the Liberal candidate for the subsequent presidential elections of 28 May 2006 and won 11.84% of the popular vote, placing him third, the worst ever result for a Liberal candidate.

During the parliamentary elections of 14 March 2010, the Liberal Party obtained 17 senators and 37 representatives, placing third in both the Chamber of Representatives and Senate. At the 2010 presidential election Liberal candidate Rafael Pardo finished sixth with 4.38% of the vote, worse than Horacio Serpa's 2006 vote. The Liberal Party went on to join the governing coalition of President Juan Manuel Santos.

See also
 Liberalism in Colombia
 Social Party of National Unity

External links
  
 Democracia a distancia: Elecciones 2006 (Portalcol.com) (Information about the party's list of candidates to the Colombian Senate, Spanish).

References

Liberal parties in Colombia
Full member parties of the Socialist International
La Violencia
1848 establishments in the Republic of New Granada
Political parties established in 1848
Radical parties
Social liberal parties
Social democratic parties in Colombia